Leongatha Airport  is located  southwest of Leongatha, Victoria, Australia.

See also
 List of airports in Victoria

References

Airports in Victoria (Australia)
Leongatha, Victoria